, the Steelers' flagship radio stations are WDVE 102.5 FM and WBGG 970 AM. Both stations are owned by IHeartMedia. Games are also available on 49 radio stations in Pennsylvania, western Maryland, Ohio, West Virginia and in Myrtle Beach, South Carolina. The announcers are Bill Hillgrove and Craig Wolfley. Missi Matthews is the sideline reporter, joined in 2021 by Max Starks. Myron Cope, the longtime color analyst and inventor of the "Terrible Towel," retired after the 2004 season, and died in 2008.

Hillgrove succeeded Jack Fleming as radio voice of the Steelers in 1994. Ironically, Hillgrove and Fleming were often in opposing radio booths during the annual Backyard Brawl, with Hillgrove calling play-by-play for the Pitt Panthers and Fleming for the West Virginia Mountaineers. 

Pre-season games not shown on one of the national broadcasters are seen on KDKA, channel 2. KDKA Sports Director Bob Pompeani and former Steelers QB Charlie Batch handle the broadcast duties. Coach Mike Tomlin's weekly press conference is shown live on KDKA-TV's sister station WPCW, channel 19.

National NFL Network broadcasts are shown locally on KDKA-TV, while national ESPN broadcasts are shown locally on WTAE, channel 4.

See also
List of Pittsburgh Steelers figures in broadcasting

References

 
Pittsburgh Steelers
broadcasters